Iisvesi is a rather large lake in Finland. The lake consists of three separate basins: Iisvesi, Virmasvesi and Rasvanki. Located within Tervo, Rautalampi, Suonenjoki and northern Kuopio on a sparsely populated area the waters are generally pretty clear.

References

Kymi basin
Lakes of Kuopio
Lakes of Tervo
Lakes of Rautalampi